KDDC may refer to:

 Dodge City Regional Airport (ICAO code KDDC)
 KDDC-LD, a low-power television station (channel 32, virtual 23) licensed to serve Dodge City, Kansas, United States